Stemonoporus moonii is a species of plant in the family Dipterocarpaceae. It is endemic to Sri Lanka.  It is threatened by habitat loss.

References

Flora of Sri Lanka
moonii
Critically endangered plants
Taxonomy articles created by Polbot